This is a list of the horse breeds usually considered to be native to Indonesia. Some may have complex or obscure histories, so inclusion here does not necessarily imply that a breed is predominantly or exclusively Indonesian.

References

Horse